Viddalba (Gallurese: Vidda 'ecchja) is a comune (municipality) in the Province of Sassari in the Italian region Sardinia, located about  north of Cagliari and about  northeast of Sassari.

Viddalba borders the following municipalities: Aggius, Badesi, Bortigiadas, Santa Maria Coghinas, Trinità d'Agultu e Vignola, Valledoria.

Sights include several domus de janas and nuraghe, a Roman necropolis and remains of a bridge, and the medieval Romanesque church of San Giovanni Evangelista.

References

External links

 Official website

Cities and towns in Sardinia
1975 establishments in Italy
States and territories established in 1975